Épagny may refer to the following places in France:

 Épagny, Aisne, a commune in the department of Aisne
 Épagny, Côte-d'Or, a commune in the department of Côte-d'Or
 Épagny, Haute-Savoie, a commune in the department of Haute-Savoie